Paul Dunlap (July 19, 1919 – March 11, 2010) was an American composer. He wrote music for over 200 films during his 30-year career. He is best known for his work with Western movies.

Early life
William Paul Dunlap was born to William P. and Janice P. Dunlap in 1919. He was born in Springfield, Ohio. He enjoyed music, and studied with great composers Arnold Schoenberg, Nadia Boulanger, and Ernst Toch. He wanted to be a concert hall or opera composer; however, there was a greater opportunity to build a career as a composer in the film industry. When he was 31 years old, Dunlap left for Hollywood to begin his career.

Career 
Dunlap's film career began in 1950 when he scored The Baron of Arizona. This was a Sam Fuller film, and led to Dunlap producing other scores for his movies like The Naked Kiss and Shock Corridor. During the 1950s and 60s, Dunlap also wrote music for low-budget films in the horror and sci-fi genres.

Dunlap wrote the scores for as more than 200 films and television programs throughout his career. These included several Three Stooges feature films, including The Three Stooges Meet Hercules, The Three Stooges in Orbit, The Three Stooges Go Around the World in a Daze and The Outlaws Is Coming. Dunlap also scored the last  Abbott and Costello film Dance With Me, Henry as well. Dunlap is also known for his scores for numerous genre-films including I Was a Teenage Werewolf, I Was a Teenage Frankenstein, Blood of Dracula, and The Angry Red Planet.

His career spanned three decades and he contributed as musical director, musical supervisor, and orchestrator. He wrote soundtracks for several movies by Harold D. Schuster. Dunlap also worked on many B movies during his career and was recognized for his Western scores.

Throughout his life, Dunlap did not forget his love of classical music.
He wrote piano concertos and choral music after his retirement from Hollywood films in 1968. In his later life, he wrote an opera. He composed again for movies, however, when he wrote the music for Gorp which was produced in 1980.

Death
Dunlap died of natural causes on March 11, 2010, in Palm Springs, California.

Selected filmography

References

External links
 
 Paul Dunlap in Epdlp
Paul Dunlap papers, MSS 2292 at L. Tom Perry Special Collections, Brigham Young University

1919 births
2010 deaths
20th-century American composers
20th-century American male musicians
20th-century American pianists
American male composers
American male pianists